Neues Volksblatt is a daily newspaper published in Linz, Austria. The paper is the official organ of the Austrian People's Party. It has been in circulation since 1869. From September 2018 the paper has been renamed as Oberösterreichische Volksblatt.

History and profile
Neues Volksblatt was established in 1869. The paper has its headquarters in Linz. It is the official organ of the Austrian People's Party and has a Christian socialist stance.

As of 2017 Neues Volksblatt was not part of the Media-Analysis or the Austrian Circulation Survey which are the leading circulation reports for Austrians print publications.

References

External links
 

1869 establishments in Austria
Christian newspapers
Daily newspapers published in Austria
German-language newspapers published in Austria
Mass media in Linz
Publications established in 1869
Conservatism in Austria